The eleventh season of Law & Order: Special Victims Unit premiered on September 23, 2009 and concluded on May 19, 2010. It was moved from Tuesdays to Wednesdays at 9 pm/8c ET for the NBC broadcast. On March 3, 2010, SVU returned to its previous time slot of 10pm/9c ET. On January 22, 2010, in the wake of the conflict between Jay Leno and Conan O'Brien, NBC announced that they would order two additional episodes to fill in the gaps of the departing The Jay Leno Show.

Production 
NBC ordered production on Season 11 in April 2009. Mick Betancourt became a writer for the eleventh season of SVU having been a long-time fan of the show. He said in an interview that one of his motivations was to "make sure that my episodes as a writer sit on the shelf with the same episodes that made me a fan." In the same interview, he discussed fan fiction and reiterated the policy held by most major networks; "People have tried to send me things and I have to send it back. It's not that I don't like it, it's just that there's a lot of legal gray area there." In 2009, many cast and crew members of SVU began using Twitter to share behind-the-scenes information. According to Betancourt there "seemed to be a gap between the show and the fans and their access to the show, and Twitter really seemed to close it."

The fifth episode "Hardwired" was widely noted for confirming that BD Wong's character George Huang is gay. Neal Baer considered the revelation to be nothing special and summarized "Have the writers always thought he was gay? Yes. Have they avoided saying it? No. It’s sort of been implied. But it doesn’t really come up in the work place unless it comes up." Huang was led to this comment because characters in the episode who tried to lobby in favor of adult-child sexual relationships compared their situation to the persecution of homosexuals. To describe the episode, Baer said "'Is pedophilia hardwired?'... We obviously don’t take the side of the pedophiles, but we do take the side that it’s hard-wired, and [ask] what do you do about it?"

Season 11 was the last full season of Law & Order: Special Victims Unit to shoot in New Jersey. In response to the business they brought to the location, the New Jersey Economic Development Authority awarded SVU more than $10.2 million in tax credits on January 14, 2013. Because of cap restraints, the credits were set to be spread out over two years — $217,000 in 2013 and $10 million in 2014.

Cast changes and returning characters 
In May 2009, Christopher Meloni and Mariska Hargitay's contracts expired when they were reportedly making $375K–385K-per episode. During negotiations for a new contract the duo attempted to go after back-end profits. NBC threatened to replace Hargitay and Meloni if "they persist in their demands for more money". After two months of negotiations Meloni and Hargitay opted to renew their contracts for two more seasons.

Christine Lahti played the new executive assistant district attorney, Sonya Paxton, for five episodes, starting with the first episode through to the fourth episode. She returned briefly in the eighth episode, where she clashed with Cabot. Neal Baer said "She's from Appeals and she's tired of having rape cases overturned because of misidentifications. She's coming to clean things up". Stephanie March returned temporarily for ten episodes starting with the fifth episode playing ADA Alexandra Cabot, while SVU attempted to find a permanent ADA. Sharon Stone joined the cast in the twenty-first episode "Torch" on April 28. She played Jo Marlowe, the new assistant district attorney for a four-episode arc. SVU executive producer Baer described her character as "a funny adrenaline junkie who loves to be in the middle of everything and shares a past with Stabler. She's been married before and has a lot of secrets." She began filming her scenes in March. Her performances were not well received by television critics. Ken Tucker of Entertainment Weekly concluded her first episode as, "an episode filled with such clunky dialogue and improbable details that by the end, she seemed like a 'special victim' herself".

Cast

Main cast 

 Christopher Meloni as Senior Detective Elliot Stabler
 Mariska Hargitay as Junior Detective Olivia Benson
 Richard Belzer as Senior Detective Sergeant John Munch
 Ice-T as Junior Detective Odafin "Fin" Tutuola
 Stephanie March as Assistant District Attorney Alexandra Cabot (10 episodes)
 BD Wong as FBI Special Agent Dr. George Huang
 Tamara Tunie as Medical Examiner Dr. Melinda Warner
 Dann Florek as Captain Donald "Don" Cragen

Crossover stars from Law & Order
 Sam Waterston as District Attorney Jack McCoy (Crossing over with Law & Order)

Recurring cast 

 Joel de la Fuente as Technical Assistance Response Unit Lieutenant Ruben Morales
 Jabari Gray as Crime Scene Unit Technician Keegan Timmons
 Christine Lahti as Executive Assistant District Attorney Sonya Paxton
 Sharon Stone as Assistant District Attorney Jo Marlowe
 Lindsay Crouse as Judge D. Andrews
 Stephen Gregory as Dr. Kyle Beresford
 Georgia Lyman as Officer Whitney Bowman
 Jeri Ryan as Defense Attorney Patrice Larue
 Amir Arison as Dr. Manning
 Tonye Patano as Judge L. Maskin
 Audrie J. Neenan as Judge Lois Preston

 Harvey Atkin as Judge Alan Ridenour
 Caren Browning as Crime Scene Unit Captain Judith Siper
 Delaney Williams as Defense Attorney John Buchanan
 J. Paul Nicholas as Defense Attorney Linden Delroy
 Ned Eisenberg as Defense Attorney Roger Kressler
 Peter Hermann as Defense Attorney Trevor Langan
 John Schuck as Chief of Detectives Muldrew
 Saila Rao as Media Technician Anu Nayyar
 Joanna Merlin as Judge Lena Petrovsky
 Chike Johnson as Victor Tate
 Sean Cullen as Brett Trask

Guest stars 

Wentworth Miller guest starred in the first episode as a police officer named Nate Kendall, who saves a rape victim in the beginning of the episode and helps SVU solve the case. In the second episode Eric McCormack played the CEO of a "sugar daddy" dating website named Vance Shepard. Scott Foley played a real-estate developer with severe alcoholism in the fourth episode "Hammered". He said that the interesting role attracted him to the show with: "the character was fully developed with addictions and problems both personally and professionally. Plus... it's SVU, come on!" His character is suspected of murdering an abortion doctor. After saying that he has no strong opinion on the issue in an interrogation room scene, Detective Tutuola tries to provoke a response by shouting "are you pro-choice or no choice?" 

Justine Ezarik played a teenage girl in "Users" who dies just as a friend leaves to meet her. Ezarik blogged that "I know, it’s sad that I’m dead but I had a great time dying!" She also posted two videos about certain details in the production of her episode. They reveal, for example, that she did not have to type on the iPhone when her character sends a text message. The typing animation was pre-rendered and designed in Keynote. In the tenth episode, John Larroquette played Randall Carver, an attorney defending a man accused of murdering children of illegal aliens. In the episode, the character was asked by Ice-T's character, Detective Tutuola, why he was defending such a man, to which he replied "It's a symptom, not the disease.", and went on to say "Garrison, Limbaugh, Beck, O'Reilly, all of them. They're like a cancer spreading ignorance and hate. I mean, they have convinced folks that immigrants are the problem, not corporations that fail to pay a living wage or a broken health care system." Bill O'Reilly took offense and stated on his show that he was outraged by Dick Wolf's using his name in such a "defamatory manner" and called it "outrageous". He went on to say that "Dick Wolf is a coward for putting it out there."

Sarah Paulson played Ann Gillette, a woman with powerful ties to crime, in the episode "Shadow". Naveen Andrews played the undercover cop investigating her. Paulson stated in an interview that "it's not easy to sort of draw on reality per se, when you're trying to get into the mind of a potential sociopath." Comedian Kathy Griffin guest starred in the episode "P.C.", playing a lesbian activist named Babs Duffy. She was originally going to share an onscreen kiss with Benson. She said "Yes, we have a lesbian kiss". Despite the kiss between the characters being shown in a "behind the scenes" video, it was not shown in the final edit. Instead, Duffy leans in for a kiss but Benson pulls away. Filming of this episode, including the kiss, is documented in the June 15, 2010 episode of Kathy Griffin: My Life on the D-list. Tony Award winner Sutton Foster also appeared in the episode "P.C." as Rosemary, a lesbian activist who becomes a rape victim.

Lee Tergesen and Mischa Barton guest-starred in the episode "Savior". Barton played a hooker named Gladys, while Tergesen played a "deranged religious zealot suspected of murder". This reunited Tergesen with his former Oz co-star Christopher Meloni, who played his lover on the show, for the first time since the show ended in 2003. Lena Olin, Richard Burgi and Russell Jones appeared in "Confidential". Olin played Ingrid Block, the high-powered attorney of Richard Morgan (Burgi), a billionaire investment banker and Jones played Morgan's head of security. Despite Sam Waterston's being listed in a press release for the episode to appear as his Law & Order character Jack McCoy, he was only mentioned. Though on April 28 he made an appearance when Sharon Stone's character Jo Marlowe "makes a major faux pas". This marked the first time Waterston appeared in the SVU squad room.

Diora Baird portrayed a rape victim whose assault was witnessed by an illegal immigrant, who was reluctant to testify who herself was a victim of unspeakable war crimes in the Democratic Republic of the Congo she was portrayed by Saidah Arrika Ekulona, in the episode "Witness". Jill Scott, Lisa Arrindell Anderson and Quinton Aaron guest-starred in "Disabled", which aired March 24. Scott played the sister and caretaker of a former singer (Lisa Arrindell Anderson) who has severe multiple sclerosis and is raped. Aaron played Scott's son. Ann-Margret and Jaclyn Smith guest-starred in the episode "Bedtime" that aired March 31. Ann-Margret played "a star of commercials that were made in the '70s" and Smith a "retired cop who works with Benson and Stabler to solve an old crime". They were joined by Morgan Fairchild, Susan Anton, William Atherton and Renee Taylor, with Helen Shaver directing again. On August 21, 2010, Ann-Margret won the Emmy Award for Outstanding Guest Actress in a Drama Series for her performance in the episode. It was the first win of her career, after being nominated 5 times prior. Lynn Cohen guest-starred in the April 21 episode titled "Beef" playing a "matriarch of an Italian Beef Company". French actress Isabelle Huppert guest starred in the season finale as the mother of a kidnapped child. Tamara Tunie's character Melinda Warner nearly died of a gunshot wound in the episode. In an interview, Tunie revealed "I was excited about working with Isabelle because I love her work and have been a big fan of her films. But my immediate question was 'Do I live?'"

Episodes

References

External links
 Law & Order: Special Victims Unit Season 11 at TVGuide.com
 Law & Order: Special Victims Unit Season 11 - TV IV
 Season 11 episodes at IMDb.com

11
2009 American television seasons
2010 American television seasons